Althepus noonadanae is a species of spider of the genus Althepus. It is endemic to Mindanao, Philippines.

References

Psilodercidae
Endemic fauna of the Philippines
Spiders of the Philippines
Spiders described in 1973